Chato Aislado is a volcano in Chile.

Chato Aislado is part of the High Andes of Chile, between 25° and 26°30′ degrees south. The Andes there at altitudes over  feature a number of volcanoes, as well as products of eruptive activity. The Salar Grande lies east of Chato Aislado. Chato Aislado has been proposed as a geosite location for Chile.

Chato Aislado features a caldera formed by explosive activity. These ignimbrites are of dacitic composition, rich in crystals and pumice and display no welding.

Chato Aislado is of Pleistocene age. The ignimbrite has been dated 1.2 million years ago. The caldera was formed within the ignimbrites erupted early in the volcano's history. The last activity generated the lava dome.

References

Sources 

 

Pleistocene calderas
Pleistocene lava domes
Calderas of Chile